Hemicordulia superba is a species of dragonfly in the family Corduliidae, 
known as the superb emerald. 
It inhabits rivers, pools and lakes in south-eastern Queensland and northern New South Wales in Australia.

Hemicordulia superba is a small to medium-sized, black and yellow dragonfly with long legs. In both males and females the inboard edge of the hindwing is rounded.

Gallery

See also
 List of dragonflies of Australia

References

Corduliidae
Odonata of Australia
Insects of Australia
Endemic fauna of Australia
Taxa named by Robert John Tillyard
Insects described in 1911